Klondike High School or Klondike School is a public high school located just south of unincorporated Klondike, Texas (USA) and classified as a 1A school by the UIL.  It is part of the Klondike Independent School District that covers the southwest portion of Dawson County along with much of northern Martin County.  In 2013, the school was rated "Met Standard" by the Texas Education Agency. In 2015, Klondike was named a Blue Ribbon School by the United States Department of Education.

Athletics
The Klondike Cougars compete in the following sports:

Basketball
Cross Country
6-Man Football
Track and Field
Volleyball

State Titles
Girls Basketball
1969(B)

See also
List of Six-man football stadiums in Texas

References

External links
Klondike ISD

Schools in Dawson County, Texas
Public high schools in Texas